Phantom is the second studio album by Norwegian black metal band Khold. It was released on 15 April 2002, through Moonfog Productions. It’s the only album with former Tulus bassist, Sir Graanug (Victor Borge), who replaced Lars Eikind during the recording sessions. Just a few months later, Sir Graanug left the band and joined Grind (Thomas Arnesen).

Track listing

Personnel 
 Khold
 Gard – vocals, guitar
 Rinn – guitar
 Sir Graanug – bass guitar
 Sarke – drums

 Additional personnel
Design – Bernt B. Ottem
Edited By [Sonic Clean Up By] – Sigurd Wongraven, Svein Solberg
Engineer [Engineered By] – Svein Solberg
Executive Producer – Moonfog Productions
Mastered By – Chris Sansom, Moonfog
Photography By [Photos Taken At Nittedal By] – Lars Eithun

References

External links 
Metallum Archives
Discogs.com

2002 albums
Khold albums